These are the official results of the Men's Pole Vault event at the 1990 European Championships in Split, Yugoslavia, held at Stadion Poljud on  28 and 30 August 1990. There were a total number of nineteen participating athletes.

Medalists

Results

Qualification
Qualification standard: Qualification Performance 5.60 or at least 12 best performers advance to the final

Final

Participation
According to an unofficial count, 19 athletes from 13 countries participated in the event.

 (1)
 (1)
 (2)
 (2)
 (3)
 (1)
 (1)
 (3)
 (1)
 (1)
 (1)
 (1)
 (1)

See also
 1988 Men's Olympic Pole Vault (Seoul)
 1991 Men's World Championships Pole Vault (Tokyo)
 1992 Men's Olympic Pole Vault (Barcelona)
 1994 Men's European Championships Pole Vault (Helsinki)

References

 Results

Pole vault
Pole vault at the European Athletics Championships